Teegaon is a Gram Panchayat village in Pandhurna Tehsil of Chhindwara district in the Indian state of Madhya Pradesh.

Geography 
It is located 79 kilometres west of the district headquarters, Chhindwara, 8 KM from Pandhurna, and 244 KM from the state capital, Bhopal. Teegaon is on the border of the Chhindwara District and Nagpur District and near the Maharashtra state border. It is the 26th biggest village by area in the sub district. Meanwhile, 0.04 square kilometer (1%) of the village is covered by forest.

Economy 
Teegaon's economy is based mainly upon Agriculture. The village has a post office and a branch of Allahabad Bank.  It has a primary school, several convents and a high school.

Transport 
Teeagon is on the Nagpur-Bhopal Highway (NH47). The nearest railway station is within the village. The nearest airport is Dr. Babasaheb Ambedkar International Airport, Nagpur (87.4 KM) and RAJABHOJ international Airport, Bhopal (253.1 KM).

Demographics 

The native language of Teegaon is Hindi and most of the village people either communicate using Hindi and Marathi.

Politics 
Village Teegaon has a Gram Panchayat, whose Sarpach is Domuji Warthi. Teegaon Lies in Pandhurna Assembly constituency, whose  MLA is Nilesh Pusaram Uikey. It lies in Chhindwara Parliamentary constituency whose MP is Nakul Kamal Nath.

References

Villages in Chhindwara district